The Friars Formation is a geologic formation in San Diego County, Southern California.

Geology
It is the uppermost unit of the La Jolla Group.  The rocks are nonmarine and lagoonal sandstone and claystone, named for exposures along the north side of Mission Valley near Friars Road.

Fossils
It preserves fossils dating back to the middle and late Eocene epoch of the Paleogene period, during the Cenozoic Era.

See also

 
 
 List of fossiliferous stratigraphic units in California
 Paleontology in California

References

Further reading 
 

Geologic formations of California
Paleogene California
Eocene Series of North America
Geology of San Diego County, California
Geography of San Diego